Kristin Laura Kreuk (born December 30, 1982) is a Canadian actress. Debuting on teen drama Edgemont, she became most known for her roles as Lana Lang in the superhero television series Smallville (2001–2011), also as Catherine Chandler in The CW sci-fi series Beauty & the Beast (2012–2016) and as Joanna Hanley in the CBC/CW legal drama series Burden of Truth (2018–2021).

She has also starred in movies such as the TV movie Snow White: The Fairest of Them All (2001) and both theatrical movies EuroTrip (2004) and Irvine Welsh's Ecstasy (2011).

Early life
Kreuk was born in Vancouver, British Columbia, to Deanna Che and Peter Kreuk, two landscape architects. Her father is of Dutch descent. Her mother is of Chinese descent, born in Indonesia; her maternal grandmother was Chinese Jamaican. Her mother and grandmother lived in Singapore and the Solomon Islands before settling in Vancouver. She has a younger sister, Justine Kreuk.

Kreuk trained in karate and gymnastics at the national level until high school, but quit in grade 11 due to scoliosis. Kreuk was planning to study forensic science or psychology at Simon Fraser University and was surprised when a casting director for the CBC television series Edgemont contacted her at her high school.

Career

Television

After filming the first season of Edgemont (a teenage soap opera set at a Vancouver-area high school) and getting herself an agent, Kreuk landed the lead role of Snow White in a TV movie, Snow White: The Fairest of Them All, which aired on ABC, and later released on DVD, in 2002. In mid-2004, Kreuk took the role of Tenar for the Sci-Fi Channel two-part miniseries Earthsea. The miniseries was filmed in Vancouver, directed by Robert Lieberman and broadcast on December 13, 2004.

After Snow White, Kreuk's agent sent an audition tape to screenwriters Alfred Gough and Miles Millar, who at the time were putting together the cast of a show they had created for the WB Network (now The CW) entitled Smallville. The series, which was slated to be shot in Vancouver, revolves around the life of teenager Clark Kent before he becomes Superman. Gough and Millar called Kreuk to WB's studios in Burbank, California to audition for the role of Clark Kent's first love, Lana Lang, and she was later cast in the part. For a while, Kreuk was starring on both Smallville and Edgemont, although her role on Edgemont slightly diminished over time. Edgemont ended its run in 2005. After seven seasons, Kreuk left Smallville in the beginning of 2008, when her character leaves town. She returned as a guest star in the show's 8th season for five episodes to conclude her storyline.

In 2009, Kreuk signed on for a multi-episode arc in season three of Chuck. She played Hannah, a computer troubleshooter who joins the Buy More Nerd Herd after being laid off from her previous job.

In 2010, she portrayed Judah Ben-Hur's sister Tirzah in the TV movie Ben Hur, which aired in Canada and later on ABC in the United States.

Kreuk was involved with two pilots that did not get picked up: a 2010 CBS sitcom entitled Hitched (which was co-created by Josh Schwartz, who was also the creator of Chuck) and a 2011 NBC drama series called 17th Precinct, which was made by Ronald D. Moore.

In February 2012, Kreuk was announced as the lead female character in The CW's reboot of Beauty & the Beast, which was picked up on May 11, 2012, and started airing in Fall 2012. The CW announced in October 2015 that the show's upcoming fourth season, scheduled to air over the summer of 2016, would be its final season. The series finale aired on August 25, 2016.

In 2018, Kreuk played the lead role in Burden of Truth, a CBC Television production in which she portrays a "big-city lawyer who takes on a case for a group of sick girls in her hometown". The show premiered on January 10, 2018. On April 5, 2018, The CW announced that they had acquired the rights to air the show beginning in summer 2018. CBC has renewed Burden of Truth for a fourth season. The series concluded in 2021 after four seasons.

Films
Kreuk appeared in the comedy film EuroTrip (2004), playing the girlfriend who cheats on the protagonist with a musician (played by Matt Damon).

In early 2005, Kreuk signed on to the Canadian independent film Partition (2007), playing Naseem, a vulnerable 17-year-old whose world is shattered by the trauma of the Partition of India in 1947; the character also falls in love with an ex-British Indian Army officer. In the summer of 2006, Kreuk starred in the short film, Dream Princess by comic book writer/artist Kaare Andrews. The film is a modern sci-punk retelling of the tale of Sleeping Beauty, with a twist. However, it never aired. Kreuk starred in the film Street Fighter: The Legend of Chun-Li (2009), in which she played the title character, Chun-Li. She tested for the sequel Mission: Impossible – Ghost Protocol (2011), with the role going to Paula Patton.

In early 2010, Kreuk signed onto the Japanese horror film Vampire (2011). In 2010, Kreuk also starred in the music video "I Heard" by musician Hill Zaini.

Kreuk stars as Heather in the film Irvine Welsh's Ecstasy (2011), based on Irvine Welsh's novel. She also stars as Tilda in the science fiction comedy film Space Milkshake (2012).

Film production
Kreuk, with Rosena Bhura, whom Kreuk met on the set of Partition, started a production company called Parvati Creative Inc, which focuses on "human-centric films as seen through a female lens". Parvati'''s first production was a short film directed by Rick Rosenthal called Blink, of which Kreuk is listed as an executive producer. The second project was a comedy web series titled Queenie which featured Kreuk's friend Olivia Cheng.

Advertising work
In 2003, Neutrogena made her the spokesmodel for their worldwide advertising campaign. In this role, Kreuk followed in the footsteps of fellow teen stars such as Jennifer Love Hewitt and Mandy Moore. In 2005, she renewed her contract with Neutrogena for another two years, becoming the company's longest-serving model spokesperson.

Voice acting
In August 2017, Kreuk provided the voice for Princess Shuyan in Shuyan Saga, a graphic novel series set in an ancient Chinese martial arts fantasy universe. She also reprised her role as Catherine Chandler from Beauty & the Beast on Robot Chicken.

Personal life
As of 2017, Kreuk resided in Toronto, Ontario. She stated on Live! with Kelly and Michael in October 2012 that she is a pescetarian.

In November 2017, Kreuk and her Smallville'' co-star Allison Mack were linked to a multi-level marketing organization and cult known as NXIVM, which was founded by Keith Raniere. In March 2018, following Raniere's arrest, Kreuk disclosed on her Twitter account that she had joined NXIVM believing it was a "self-help" group but left in 2013, and had not witnessed any illegal or nefarious activities during her time in the group. Kreuk's statement was backed by actress Sarah Edmondson, who had participated in exposing NXIVM's activities.

Filmography

Television

Film

Video games

Producer

Awards and nominations
In 2015, Kreuk was ranked as Canada's most beautiful person in an online poll organized by ET Canada.

See also
Chinese Canadians in Greater Vancouver

References

External links

1982 births
Living people
Actresses from Vancouver
Canadian actresses of Chinese descent
Canadian film actresses
Canadian people of Dutch descent
Canadian people of Indonesian descent
Canadian people of Jamaican descent
Canadian soap opera actresses
Canadian television actresses
NXIVM people
21st-century Canadian actresses